Noël Jean-Charles André Gallon (11 September 1891 – 26 December 1966) was a French composer and music educator. His compositional output includes several choral works and vocal art songs, 10 preludes, a Toccata for piano, a Sonata for flute and bassoon, a Fantasy for piano and orchestra, an Orchestral Suite, and the lyrical drama Paysans et Soldats (1911).

Biography 
Born in Paris' 6th arrondissement, Gallon was the younger brother of composer Jean Gallon with whom he studied harmony at the Paris Conservatoire. In 1910 he won the Prix de Rome with the cantata Acis et Galathée. In 1920 he joined the faculty of the conservatoire as a professor of solfège. He began teaching counterpoint at the school in 1926. His many notable students include such well-known composers as Claude Arrieu, Tony Aubin, Jocelyne Binet, Gerd Boder, Paul Bonneau, Pierre Dervaux, Maurice Duruflé, Henri Dutilleux, Ulvi Cemal Erkin, Lukas Foss, Jean Hubeau, Paul Kuentz, Paule Maurice, Xian Xinghai, Olivier Messiaen, Pedro Ipuche Riva, and René Saorgin. 

He died in Paris.

1891 births
1966 deaths
French classical organists
French male organists
20th-century classical composers
Academic staff of the Conservatoire de Paris
Conservatoire de Paris alumni
French opera composers
French male classical composers
Prix de Rome for composition
Musicians from Paris
Recipients of the Legion of Honour
20th-century organists
20th-century French composers
20th-century French male musicians
Male classical organists